Tallapoosa may refer to:


People
 Tallapoosas, a division of Upper Creek Indians in Alabama

Places in the United States
Tallapoosa, Georgia
Tallapoosa, Missouri
Tallapoosa County, Alabama
Tallapoosa River, Alabama

Ships
USS Tallapoosa (1863)
USCGC Tallapoosa (WPG-52)

See also